Francisco Paúl Uscanga Gutiérrez (born 25 March 1991) is a Mexican professional footballer who plays as a midfielder for club Cancún.

Career
Uscanga began his young career with the Tiburones Rojos de Boca del Rio, scoring 12 goals in 33 games. He moved up to Club León in 2008, but never found the back of the net during 4 games. He later signed with Potros Chetumal, the filial team to Atlante F.C. He impressed Atlante's coach José Guadalupe Cruz, and called him up to the first team on January 24, 2009, during a 2–0 loss to Monarcas Morelia. Uscanga played only 1 minute, plus injury time in this game. He later logged 22 minutes against CF Atlas in another loss, this time 1–0.

His older brother, Óscar, also plays for Atlante and like Paúl, he is a striker.

Notes

External links

1991 births
Living people
Footballers from Veracruz
Mexican footballers
Liga MX players
Atlante F.C. footballers
Club León footballers
Association football forwards
People from Coatzacoalcos
C.F. Mérida footballers